Kelli Cousins is an American former voice actress. She has provided voices for Japanese anime titles for ADV Films. She also wrote script adaptations for anime under the alias Kathleen Moynihan. She lives in Chicago, Illinois.

Voice roles

Anime
 Chance Pop Session - Akari Mizushima
 Colorful - Consolation Prize, Additional Voices
 Diamond Daydreams - Akari Harada
 Excel Saga - Roppanmatsu 1
 Full Metal Panic! - Seina Kaguyama (Eps. 9-12)
 Kino's Journey - Kino
 Martian Successor Nadesico - Harumi Tanaka, Mari (Ep. 23), Seelie (Ep. 13)
 Neo Ranga - Ushio Shimabara
 Orphen: The Revenge - Charlotte (Ep. 8), Esperanza (Ep. 8, 11) 
 Princess Nine - Seira Morimura
 Rahxephon - Helena Bähabem
 Rune Soldier - Celecia, Odessa (Ep. 14)
 Saiyuki - Dr. Huang (Eps. 9-29), Hakuryu, Houfa (Ep. 25), Shunrei (Ep. 4)
 Steel Angel Kurumi - Kurumi
 The Samurai - Chigusa Chimatsuri

Video games
 Unlimited Saga - Laura, Norff

Live-action dubbing
 Gamera: Revenge of Iris - Ayana Hirasaka

Production credits

ADR script
 Air
 Cromartie High School
 Diamond Daydreams
 Kaleido Star
 Kanon
 Pani Poni Dash!
 Slayers Premium

References

External links
Official website

Year of birth missing (living people)
Living people
American voice actresses
Place of birth missing (living people)
Rice University alumni
Columbia College Chicago alumni
21st-century American women